A rear-view mirror is a mirror in vehicles which allows the driver to see the area behind the vehicle. Rear-view mirror and its variants may also refer to:

Art, entertainment, and media

Albums
 Rearview Mirror: An American Musical Journey, 2005 album by Don McLean
 rearviewmirror (Greatest Hits 1991–2003), Pearl Jam's first greatest hits album

Songs
 "Rear View Mirror", a song by Alicia Keys from her 2001 album Songs in A Minor
 "Rear View Mirror", a song by E-40 featuring B-Legit and Stressmatic, from the 2011 album
 Rear View Mirror, a song by Grandaddy from their 2006 album Just Like the Fambly Cat
 Rearview, a song by Anastacia from her 2005 album Anastacia
 Rearviewmirror (song), a song by Pearl Jam from their 1993 album Vs.

See also
Rear Window (disambiguation)